Ilya Gorokhov (born 23 August 1977) is a Russian former professional ice hockey defenceman. He last played with Amur Khabarovsk of the Kontinental Hockey League (KHL). Gorokhov was selected by the New York Rangers in the 8th round (195th overall) of the 1995 NHL Entry Draft, originally playing in the Russian Superleague with Lokomotiv Yaroslavl.

He was the last member of the Las Vegas Thunder of the IHL to be active in playing professional hockey. On May 2, 2016, Gorokhov added his veteran presence to HC Sochi, agreeing as a free agent to a one-year deal. He played 27 games with Sochi before he was traded to end his 23-year professional career with Amur Khabarovsk to conclude the 2016–17 season.

Career statistics

Regular season and playoffs

International

References

External links

1977 births
Living people
Amur Khabarovsk players
Atlant Moscow Oblast players
HC Lada Togliatti players
Las Vegas Thunder players
Lokomotiv Yaroslavl players
HC Dynamo Moscow players
Russian ice hockey defencemen
Salavat Yulaev Ufa players
HC Sochi players
Sportspeople from Yaroslavl
Torpedo Nizhny Novgorod players
New York Rangers draft picks